Augustus Daniel Imms FRS (24 August 1880, in Moseley, Worcestershire – 3 April 1949 in Tipton St. John near Sidmouth,  Devon) was an English educator, research administrator and entomologist. An influential textbook of entomology that he first wrote went into several editions during his life and was updated posthumously with Imms' General Textbook of Entomology last being published in 1977 as a 10th edition.

Early life
Augustus was the elder of two children, his sister dying before him. His father, Walter Imms, worked at Lloyds Bank. His mother, Mary Jane Daniel, was born at Newark, New Jersey, U.S.A., of English parents who returned to England a few years later. He was among the few in his family who took to science.

He suffered from asthma and his private schooling was interrupted frequently. He spent some time at St Edmunds High School, Birmingham, where the headmaster, William Bywater Grove, was a well-known mycologist. His interest in natural history was however encouraged most by C. F. Olney of the Northampton Natural History Society. He bought Robert Bentley Todd's Cyclopædia of Anatomy and Physiology when he was about seventeen years old, and this had George Newport's detailed article on the 'Insecta'.

Later life
Imms studied science at Mason University College, Birmingham, and although his father wished him to become an industrial chemist, he took to  biology. He studied under T. W. Bridge, then Professor of Zoology, and produced two scientific papers on fishes (1904, 1905). His contemporaries included B. Fantham, T. Goodey and R. H. Whitehouse. He graduated B.Sc. London with a second-class honours in zoology in 1903. After spending two years under Bridge at Birmingham, the award of an 1851 Exhibition Science Scholarship in 1905 helped him go to Cambridge, where he joined Christ's College under A. E. Shipley. He received his MSc in 1906 from the University of Birmingham. He worked as a student demonstrator and assistant demonstrator in zoology at Birmingham.

In 1911, Imms received an offer from the Government of India to become Forest Entomologist at Dehra Dun to succeed E. P. Stebbing. He studied lac cultivation in the Central Provinces and the pests of coniferous forests. He considered the six years in India as a better option that staying on in Cambridge and acquiring a ‘myopic impression that Cambridge is the centre of the universe’. In 1913 he left India for health reasons and accepted a post of reader in Agricultural Entomology under Professor S. J. Hickson at Manchester. In the years 1914 to 1918, Imms was rejected by various recruiting boards. He wrote to Rothamsted Experimental Station, urging the authorities to set up an entomology department and in 1918 it was established with him as chief entomologist.

The first edition of his A General Textbook of Entomology appeared in 1925, published by Methuen. Its seventh edition appeared in 1948, the year before his death. By then it had become the premier entomological textbook of its day, rivalled at that time only by the much earlier (1888) American An Introduction to Entomology by John Henry Comstock. After Imms' death, three more editions were produced by Owain Richards and Richard Gareth Davies, their final, tenth edition appearing in 1977. It still is sufficiently significant to have been reprinted in soft cover.

Works
 A general textbook of entomology: Including the anatomy, physiology, development and classification of insects (1925 - )
 Recent advances in entomology. London Churchill 1931
 Insect Natural History. New Naturalist, Collins, London (1947).

He was a Fellow of the Royal Society and the Royal Entomological Society.

In 1947 he was elected a Member of the American Academy of Arts and Sciences

References

External links
 

1880 births
1949 deaths
People from Moseley
English entomologists
Fellows of the Royal Society
Fellows of the Royal Entomological Society
New Naturalist writers
20th-century British zoologists